A QIZ is a Qualifying Industrial Zone in Egypt or Jordan.

Qiz may refer to:
Qiz-e Bala
Qiz-e Pain
Qiz Ulan
Qiz Qaleh
Qiz Qalehsi
Qiz Qapan